The Journey is a song written by David Hirschfelder and Tommy Emmanuel and recorded by Emmanuel for his studio album, The Journey. The song peaked at number 29 on the ARIA Charts in September 1993 becoming his highest charting single.

Track listing 
CD single (Columbia Records – 659567)
 "The Journey" – 4:10
 "Hellos & Goodbyes" – 4:37
 "The Journey"  (The Pine Creek Mix)  – 4:52

Charts

References 

1993 songs
1993 singles